Gröningen is a town in the Börde district in Saxony-Anhalt, Germany. It lies approx. 40 km south-west of Magdeburg, and 10 km east of Halberstadt. It has 3.621 inhabitants (December 2015). Gröningen is part of the Verbandsgemeinde Westliche Börde.

People 
 Angelika Unterlauf, German journalist (b, 1946)

References

Towns in Saxony-Anhalt
Börde (district)